Henryk Roman Gulbinowicz (17 October 1923 – 16 November 2020) was a prelate of the Catholic Church who served as Archbishop of Wrocław from 1976 to 2004. Pope John Paul II made him a cardinal in 1985. In 2020, he was banned from making public appearances following a Holy See investigation that confirmed allegations that he had committed sexual abuse and evidence that he had been a secret police informant from 1969 to 1985. Following his death, Gulbinowicz was forbidden to have his funeral service at the city’s Cathedral of St. John the Baptist or to be buried in the cathedral.

Biography

Early life and priesthood
Henryk Roman Gulbinowicz was born on 17 October 1923 in Wilno, Poland (now Vilnius, Lithuania). He grew up in Szukiszki (Šukiškės). He entered the archdiocesan seminary where he completed his secondary studies, upon being transferred to Białystok.

Archbishop Romuald Jalbrzykowski ordained him as a priest on 18 June 1950, and he was an associate pastor at Szudzialowo. After a year of parish experience, he was sent to Lublin to continue his preparation in theology at the Catholic University of Lublin. He earned a doctorate in moral theology in 1955. From 1956 to 1959 he was university chaplain in Białystok. He then taught in the seminary at Warmia, while also working in the diocesan Curia of Olsztyn.

Episcopacy
On 12 January 1970, Pope Paul VI appointed him titular Bishop of Acci and made him apostolic administrator of the Polish section of the Archdiocese of Vilnius (Białystok). The following 8 February he received his episcopal consecration from Cardinal Stefan Wyszyński. In charge of the church community, he was responsible for the reorganization of the diaconate and he also promoted the construction of new parishes. Beginning in 1944, despite wartime conditions, he furthered the growth of religious life in his area by creating in Białystok the Parish Catechetics Center and reviving the trimestral publication "Wiadomości Kościelne Archidiecezij w Białystoku" (Church news of the archdiocese of Białystok).

On 3 January 1976, he became Archbishop of Wrocław. While guiding this local church during these years, he created many pastoral centers in this large region. In addition, he founded the biweekly "Nowe Życie" (New Life) and crowned the statue of the Virgin as protector of the famous shrine of Wambierzyce in Lower Silesia, which is a pilgrimage center.

A few days before martial law was imposed in 1981, the local Solidarity union branch withdrew from its bank account 80 million zlotys, the equivalent of today's USD $100 million, and deposited the cash with Gulbinowicz, who hid it from the communist regime during Solidarity's delegalisation.

Cardinalate
On 25 May 1985 Gulbinowicz was created cardinal by John Paul II.

He was recognized as a voice of the moderate wing of the church in Poland. Where Cardinal Glemp of Warsaw warned priests against involvement with Solidarity, Gulbinowicz intervened with the Communist government on behalf of striking railway repair yard workers. In 1985 he identified the Church closely with Lech Wałęsa's leadership and told crowds of union-supporting pilgrims "Hang in there, as we are hanging in". A year later he told a similar crowd: "Only the right to organize independent organizations will enable Poland to overcome the severe political and economic crises troubling this country." At a ceremony commemorating the 50th anniversary of the Soviet invasion of Poland, he counselled patience with the post-Soviet government's attempts to rebuild Poland's economy and political institutions. He said "every thinking person in Poland understands that the good toward which the nation is moving must be paid for at the beginning with sacrifices.... Some laughed at our ideals, and even at the people who were faithful to those ideals" and said that Solidarity had proved faithful to its principles. He also avoided Glemp's "nationalist tones". When he welcomed the Pope to Wrocław, he spoke of tolerance and said the city was the work of various nationalities and religions over the centuries.

Resignation
Pope John Paul accepted his resignation as Archbishop of Wrocław on 3 April 2004, when he was thought to be 75 years old, the age at which bishops are required to submit their resignations. It then transpired that in 1942, as a young man, Gulbinowicz had falsified his birth records to escape being sent to a labor camp in Germany, listing the year of his birth as 1928 instead of 1923. Though the falsification suggested he was ordained a priest at a very young age, his correct age only became public in 2004 when an Italian newspaper noted that John Paul had accepted his resignation as Bishop of Wrocław at the age of 80, not 75. In 2005, with the end of Pope John Paul's life approaching, the birth-year discrepancy became more important and was published more widely. Had Gulbinowicz been born in 1928, he would be eligible to participate in a conclave to select John Paul's successor. With the correction, it was seen that he was past his 80th birthday and ineligible. Gulbinowicz told the Catholic Information Agency (Poland) that many of his peers employed this strategy and that after the war no one thought it necessary to restore his true birthdate to his documents. He said that his superiors had known the truth from the time he entered the seminary and that John Paul had known from before he became Pope. The correct birth date was printed in the Pontifical Yearbook presented to John Paul on 31 January 2005.

He was the author of a number of works in the new area of moral and doctrinal theology and on the formation of the clergy.

Sexual abuse allegations 
On 6 November 2020, the Holy See's Nuncio to Poland announced that following a Vatican investigation regarding sex abuse allegations against Gulbinowicz, Gulbinowicz was now "barred from any kind of celebration or public meeting and from using his episcopal insignia, and is deprived of the right to a cathedral funeral and burial." He was ordered to pay "an appropriate sum" to his alleged victims.

Death
Gulbinowicz died on 16 November 2020 at 10:40am, just 10 days after the ruling against him was given, after having fallen unconscious in hospital. The cardinal was admitted to hospital in Wrocław on 10 November, just four days following the ruling. He died due to respiratory and circulatory failure after having suffered from acute pneumonia. His remains were cremated and the ashes interred on 23 November in secrecy at his family's tomb at Olsztyn, where his parents were interred.

Notes

References

External links

 

|-

Archbishops of Wrocław
Bishops of Białystok
21st-century Polish cardinals
1923 births
2020 deaths
People from Vilnius
Cardinals created by Pope John Paul II
Recipients of the Gold Medal for Merit to Culture – Gloria Artis
Catholic Church sexual abuse scandals in Poland
20th-century Polish cardinals
Recipients of the Order of the White Eagle (Poland)